The Setchell Carlson Company was a manufacturer of radios, electronic equipment, and televisions from 1928 until the 1960s. The company was founded in St. Paul, Minnesota, in 1928 by Bart Setchell and Carl Donald Carlson under the name "Karadio Corporation", and its first product was a car radio. The company took the name Setchell Carlson in 1934, and produced consumer radios.

During World War II, the company switched to war production, and its most prominent product was the BC-1206-C aviation range receiver.

After the war, the company moved to New Brighton, Minnesota, in 1949, and produced televisions, which continued until the 1960s. In the late 1960s or early 1970s, the company moved away from consumer televisions and focused on equipment for institutions, such as schools. It eventually became a subsidiary of Audiotronics Corporation.

At its peak in the 1960s, the company employed about 500 at two plants in New Brighton and Arden Hills, Minnesota.

References

Minneapolis School A-V Equipment of the 1960s and 1970s

1928 establishments in Minnesota
Electronics companies of the United States
Defunct manufacturing companies based in Minnesota
Radio manufacturers